Ye Beihua (2 February 1907 – 5 December 1987) was a Chinese footballer. He competed in the football tournament at the 1936 Summer Olympics.

References

External links
 

1907 births
1987 deaths
Chinese footballers
China international footballers
Olympic footballers of China
Footballers at the 1936 Summer Olympics
People from Huiyang
Association football midfielders